In Judaism, Christianity, and some other Abrahamic religions, the cultural mandate is the divine injunction found in Genesis 1:28, in which  God, after having created the world and all in it, ascribes to humankind the tasks of filling, subduing, and ruling over the earth. The cultural mandate includes the sentence "Be fruitful and multiply and fill the Earth." The cultural mandate was given to Adam and Eve.

The text finds an immediate interpretation in the opening chapter of the book of Exodus as the description of the Israelites in Egypt are alluded to as, "fruitful, increased greatly, multiplied, and extremely strong, so that the land was filled with them."

In Orthodox and Conservative Judaism, the mandate to "be fruitful and multiply" is interpreted as requiring every couple to have at least a son and a daughter. Other Jewish groups (such as Reform Judaism) and individual Jews have interpreted this mandate differently. For example, Richard Friedman in his Commentary on the Torah (2001) claims that the mandate "be fruitful and multiply and fill the Earth" has "been fulfilled." The mandate is elaborated upon in numerous parts of the Talmud, for example in Kidushin.

In the interpretation of some denominations of Christianity, adherents should actively work to fulfill the mandate.
Within Christianity in general, the cultural mandate is most elaborately developed in the West by Neo-Calvinism, which explores the implications for modern, pluralistic society, of this Calvinistic assertion. 

Despite "be fruitful and multiply" being the most important mitzvah, contraception is permitted in Judaism in appropriate circumstances such as difficult family situations. In instances like these, rabbis may allow women to start contraceptive methods.

Biblical text
The text of Genesis 1:28 states:

See also 
 Creation mandate, in Reformed Christianity

References

Book of Genesis
Christian democracy
Positive Mitzvoth
Religious concepts related with Adam and Eve
Natalism
Genesis 1